Ranganayaki, is a 1981 Kannada film directed by Puttanna Kanagal starring Aarathi, Ambareesh,  Ramakrishna, Ashok, Rajanand. The film is based on the novel Ranganayaki by Ashwattha.

Plot
Ranganayaki is a theater artiste who plays the lead female role in all the plays staged by the drama company owned by her foster-father. When a rich man, Nagaraja, falls in love with her, she marries him and draws the curtain on her career. The drama company falls on tough times after her departure. On one occasion, when the drama company faces an emergency with the new actress absconding, Ranganayaki dons the grease paint to save her father's reputation. This one act ends her marriage, and her husband leaves town with their year-old son.

Ranganayaki returns to theater but with the death of her father, and in the face of mounting losses is forced to close the drama company. Supported by her foster-brother Ramanna she goes onto become a popular movie heroine 'Mala'. Twenty years later, Shekhar, a college student, not only becomes her most ardent fan but also becomes besotted by her. Neither is aware of their true relationship - that they are mother and son. A chance meeting with her ex-husband makes 'Mala' yearn to meet her son. While circumstances make sure this does not happen, by the time Shekhar realizes the truth about her identity, 'Mala' who suffers from bouts of depression, would have taken her own life.

Cast
 Aarathi as Ranganayaki / Mala
 Ashok as Nagaraj Shetty, Ranganayaki's husband
 Ramakrishna as Shekhar, Nagaraj Shetty's son
 Ambareesh as Ramanna
 Rajanand as Shyamanna
 Sudha Rani as young Ranganayaki
 Sadashiva Brahmavar as Krishnappa, caretaker of Mala's house
 Kunigal Ramanath
 B. K. Shankar as Basava, a stage actor
 Shringar Nagaraj as a stage actor
 Gangadhar as Seth, filmmaker (cameo)
 Dinesh as Venkataramana Shetty, Nagaraj's father (cameo)
 Musuri Krishnamurthy as Nagaraj's uncle (cameo)
 M. Jayashree as Pankajamma, neighbour of Ranganayaki (cameo)

Soundtrack

Awards 
1980–81 Karnataka State Film Awards
 First Best film – B. Thimmanna	
 Best Actress – Aarathi
 Best Supporting Actor – Ramakrishna

References

External links 
 

1981 films
1980s Kannada-language films
Films scored by M. Ranga Rao
Films directed by Puttanna Kanagal